Kam Kuh (also Romanized as Kam Kūh; also known as Konkūsh) is a village in Narestan Rural District, Aqda District, Ardakan County, Yazd Province, Iran. At the 2006 census, its population was 61, in 20 families.

References 

Populated places in Ardakan County